Yvonne Dolphin-Cooper (born 4 August 1956) is an English cricket umpire.

Career
Dolphin-Cooper began umpiring in domestic women's cricket in 2012, and has officiated in the Women's Twenty20 Cup, the Women's County Championship, the Rachael Heyhoe Flint Trophy and the Charlotte Edwards Cup.

She has also umpired in the West of England Premier League and in visually impaired cricket matches. She officiated as an umpire in an international visually impaired cricket match between England and India.

In May 2021, she, alongside Anna Harris, created history by becoming the first-all female umpiring duo ever in ECB Premier League history when they officiated together in a West of England Premier League match between Downend CC and Bedminster in Gloucestershire.

References

External links 
 
 

1956 births
Living people
People from Coventry
English cricket umpires
Women cricket umpires
English women referees and umpires